Lake Shangrila was a census-designated place (CDP) in the town of Salem, Kenosha County, Wisconsin, United States. The population was 861 at the 2010 census. The core area of the CDP was annexed into the village of Bristol on March 15, 2011, at the same time that the CDP was deleted.

Geography
Lake Shangrila is located at  (42.506274, -88.072471).

According to the United States Census Bureau, the CDP has a total area of 1.0 square miles (2.5 km2), of which, 0.7 square miles (1.9 km2) of it is land and 0.2 square miles (0.6 km2) of it (24.74%) is water.

Demographics

As of the census of 2000, there were 805 people, 299 households, and 214 families residing in the CDP. The racial makeup of the CDP was 97.14% White, 1.12% African American, 0.25% Asian, 1.12% from other races, and 0.37% from two or more races. Hispanic or Latino of any race were 1.99% of the population.

There were 299 households, out of which 31.4% had children under the age of 18 living with them, 57.5% were married couples living together, 10.4% had a female householder with no husband present, and 28.1% were non-families. 21.7% of all households were made up of individuals, and 8.0% had someone living alone who was 65 years of age or older. The average household size was 2.61 and the average family size was 3.06.

In the CDP, the population was spread out, with 26.3% under the age of 18, 5.6% from 18 to 24, 31.3% from 25 to 44, 24.8% from 45 to 64, and 11.9% who were 65 years of age or older. The median age was 38 years. For every 100 females, there were 107.5 males. For every 100 females age 18 and over, there were 103.8 males.

The median income for a household in the CDP was $65,977, and the median income for a family was $67,070. Males had a median income of $47,083 versus $35,972 for females. The per capita income for the CDP was $24,606. About 5.2% of families and 7.5% of the population were below the poverty line, including 2.9% of those under age 18 and none of those age 65 or over.

References

External links
Lake Shangri-La Property Owners Association

Geography of Kenosha County, Wisconsin
Former census-designated places in Wisconsin
Neighborhoods in Wisconsin